The 2003 Volvo PGA Championship was the 49th edition of the Volvo PGA Championship, an annual professional golf tournament on the European Tour. It was held 22–25 May at the West Course of Wentworth Club in Virginia Water, Surrey, England, a suburb southwest of London.

Ignacio Garrido beat Trevor Immelman in a playoff to claim his first Volvo PGA Championship.

Course layout

Past champions in the field 
Eight former champions entered the tournament.

Made the cut

Missed the cut

Nationalities in the field

Round summaries

First round 
Thursday, 22 May 2003

Second round 
Friday, 23 May 2003

Third round 
Saturday, 24 May 2003

Final round 
Sunday, 25 May 2003

Scorecard

Cumulative tournament scores, relative to par

Source:

Playoff 
The playoff began on the par five 18th; Immelman reached the green in two; while Garrido's second shot clattered into the trees and came to rest just off the green. Garrido played a superb chip shot to 2-feet, leaving himself a tap-in birdie. Immelman three-putted to hand the Spaniard the title.

References 

BMW PGA Championship
Golf tournaments in England
Volvo PGA Championship
Volvo PGA Championship
Volvo PGA Championship